Wyndmoor station is a SEPTA Regional Rail station at 256 East Willow Grove Avenue at Wyndmoor Street in the Chestnut Hill region of Philadelphia, Pennsylvania. The station can be traced as far back as 1863, with a relocation in 1877. The present station building was built by the Reading Company in 1930, when the line was elevated, and began taking in travelers from the recently closed Mermaid Avenue Reading Station.
The station is in zone 2 on the Chestnut Hill East Line, on former Reading Railroad tracks, and is 10.0 track miles from Suburban Station. In 2013, this station saw 471 boardings and 509 alightings on an average weekday. Most regular commuters from Wyndmoor station are from Chestnut Hill and the adjacent Wyndmoor neighborhood, with some also from Erdenheim and Laverock.

Station layout

References

External links
 SEPTA - Wyndmoor Station
 PhillyHistory.org photo taken during line elevation project, October 1930
 Willow Grove Avenue entrance from Google Maps Street View
 Wyndmoor Street entrance from Google Maps Street View

SEPTA Regional Rail stations
Former Reading Company stations
Chestnut Hill, Philadelphia
Railway stations in the United States opened in 1863